Microbacterium oleivorans is a Gram-positive and crude-oil-degrading bacterium from the genus Microbacterium which has been isolated from an oil storage cavern in Germany.

References

Further reading

External links
Type strain of Microbacterium oleivorans at BacDive -  the Bacterial Diversity Metadatabase	

Bacteria described in 2005
oleivorans